Pala (cuneiform pa-la-a was a Bronze Age country in Northern Anatolia. Little is known of Pala except its native Palaic language and its native religion. Their language shared common innovations with Luwian not present in the Hittite language suggesting a prior Luwian-Palaic linguistic complex.

Location 

Pala is said to have been bordered by Tummana to the east, Kalasma to the west and Kaissiya to Mount Asharpaya toward the south.
The country named *Bla leading to Blaene in cuneiform script was written as pa-la-a. The country of Pala may have been located along the Black Sea coast, either in the region known as Paphlagonia in classical antiquity or the much smaller territory of Blaene located within, though it has been alternately located near modern-day Sivas as well.  Bryce believed it was situated 600 km to the east of ancient Troy.

History 

In the Old Hittite period Pala was mentioned as an administrative area under Hittite jurisdiction in the Hittite laws. At the end of the Old Hittite period, contact between the Hittites and Pala ceased because of the capture of the Black Sea region by the Kaskian people, though the area was still referred to as 'the land of Pala" as late as the reign of Muršili II (1330–1295 BCE). It is likely that the Palaic peoples disappeared after the Kaskian invasion.

Mythology 

The Palaic mythology is known from cuneiform ritual texts from the temple of the Palaic storm god in the Hittite capital Ḫattuša where the cult of Palaic deities continued even when contacts between Hittites and Pala had disappeared. The following deities are known:

References 

Palaic peoples
States in Bronze Age Anatolia
Hittite Empire